The Bielefeld University of Applied Sciences (Fachhochschule Bielefeld) is the second largest education institution in Bielefeld. It divides itself into six faculties (Fachbereiche):

Divisions
 Faculty 1: Design (Gestaltung)
The Faculty of Design is located in a separate building close to the Oetker Concert Hall as well as a public park called Bürger Park (park of the commons). Three different branches of design and arts are available to the carefully selected students: "Photography & Media", "Graphic and Communication Design" and "Fashion Design". There are accepted about 25-30 freshmen in each branch per year. The school is rated among the top five of Germany's schools offering a focused education in photography, honoured by the state-funded "Special Research Centre on Photography & Media". The school's photography students are also entitled to compete - among the students of other famous European institutions like the Royal College of Arts London and the École Nationale Supérieure des Arts Décoratifs Paris - in the annual Leica Photography Award.

 Faculty 2: Campus Minden (Architecture, Civil Engineering, Engineering and Computer Science) The Faculty is located in the town of Minden.
 Faculty 3: Engineering and Mathematics
 Faculty 4: Social Sciences
 Faculty 5: Business
 Faculty 6: Health

External links

 

Universities and colleges in North Rhine-Westphalia
Universities of Applied Sciences in Germany
Bielefeld